James Como was Chairman and Professor of the Department of Performing and Fine Arts at York College of the City University of New York (CUNY), in Jamaica, Queens.
He is author of five books on C. S. Lewis, and a contributor to National Review. He founded the New York C. S. Lewis society. He has a PhD from Columbia University.

Books about C. S. Lewis 
 James Como, C. S. Lewis at the Breakfast Table and Other Reminiscences. New edition, Harcourt Brace Jovanovich, 1992. 
 James Como, Branches to Heaven: The Geniuses of C. S. Lewis, Spence, 1998.
 James Como, Remembering C. S. Lewis (3rd ed. of C. S. Lewis at the Breakfast Table), Ignatius, 2006
 James Como, C. S. Lewis: A Very Short Introduction, Oxford University Press, 2019. 
 James Como, Mystical Perelandra: My Lifelong Reading of C.S. Lewis and His Favorite Book, Winged Lion Press, 2022.

References 

American non-fiction writers
Living people
York College, City University of New York faculty
Year of birth missing (living people)